Rhopalovalva is a genus of moths belonging to the subfamily Olethreutinae of the family Tortricidae.

Species

Rhopalovalva amabilis Oku, 1974
Rhopalovalva connata Zhang & Li, 2017
Rhopalovalva exartemana (Kennel, 1901)
Rhopalovalva grapholitana (Caradja, 1916)
Rhopalovalva lascivana (Christoph, 1882)
Rhopalovalva macrocuculla Zhang & Li, 2017
Rhopalovalva moriutii Oku, 2005
Rhopalovalva orbiculata Zhang & Li, 2004
Rhopalovalva ovata Zhang & Li, 2004
Rhopalovalva pulchra (Butler, 1879)
Rhopalovalva rhombea Zhang & Li, 2010
Rhopalovalva triangulata Zhang & Li, 2010

See also
List of Tortricidae genera

References

External links
Tortricid.net

Eucosmini
Tortricidae genera